Howmeh-ye Jonubi Rural District is a rural district (dehestan) in the Central District of Eslamabad-e Gharb County, Kermanshah Province, Iran. At the 2006 census, its population was 15,173, in 3,376 families. The rural district has 46 villages.

References 

Rural Districts of Kermanshah Province
Eslamabad-e Gharb County